Mr. Moon or Mister Moon may refer to:

Television
Mister Moon (with Ed Leahy), 1955–1958 List of local children's television series
Mr Moon (TV series), 2010 Disney animated series

Music
"Mr. Moon" (Headless Chickens song), 1993
"Mr. Moon" (Mando Diao song), 2002
"Mr. Moon" (Carl Smith song), 1951
"Mr. Moon", a 1994 song by Jamiroquai, from the album The Return of the Space Cowboy
"Mister Moon", a 1963 single by Pat Boone
"Mister Moon", a song by Ian Gomm and Jeb Loy Nichols, from the album Only Time Will Tell